A street running train is a train which runs on a track built on public streets. The rails are embedded in the roadway, and the train shares the street with other users, such as pedestrians, cars and cyclists, thus often being referred to as running in mixed traffic or sharing the road with trains. For safety, street running trains travel more slowly than trains on dedicated rights-of-way. Needing to share the right-of-way with motor vehicles can cause delays and pose a safety risk.

Stations on such routes are rare and may appear similar in style to a tram stop, but often lack platforms, pedestrian islands, or other amenities. In some cases, passengers may be required to wait on a distant sidewalk, and then board or disembark by crossing the traffic. The last street-station in the USA was in Michigan City, until 2022.

Argentina

Australia 

Mossman, a narrow-gauge sugar-cane railway runs down Mill Street
Nambour, the Moreton Central Sugar Mill Cane Tramway ran down Mill Street, was also street running on a bridge at Bli Bli, closed 2003 The rails in the street remained in place and a tourist tram is planned on it.
Port Pirie, the Adelaide-Port Augusta railway line line ran down the centre of Ellen Street until 1967
Rockhampton, the North Coast main line runs down Denison Street, double track line singled in 1996
Yass, Yass Tramway from Yass Junction to Yass Town ran down Dutton Street, closed 1988 The route is no longer connected, but the tracks in Dutton street and by the station are still present and are on the heritage list.

Canada 
Notable examples in Canada include:
 Brantford, Ontario: Clarence Street (From Nelson Street to Icomm Drive, formerly Canadian National Railway; now Southern Ontario Railway, still in use) (not on the road although tracks do occupy the right turn lane at Colborne Street)
 Guelph, Ontario (also not real street running):
 Kent Street (from Glasgow Street to Gordon Street), CNR, still in use
 St. Catharines, Ontario: 
 Ontario Street (removed) (to the disappeared car factory) (continues to Louisa St.) (diagonal between the houses) (former track partly still visible from the air)
 Louisa Street (From just east of Thomas Street to Catherine Street, Canadian National Railway, originally Niagara St. Catharines Toronto Railway. Electric interurban (branch from Port Dalhousie-west) (until 1959) removed, continues to Welland Avenue below)
 Welland Avenue (From Francis Street to Balfour Street, removed) (continues to Niagara St.)
 Raymond Street (depot only)
 Niagara Street (continues to Facer St.)
 Facer Street (branch to Niagara~on~the~Lake)
 Electric interurban network to Port Dalhousie-west, Port Dalhousie-east, Niagara-on-the-Lake, Port Colborne, and Niagara Falls. All tracks on the streets are removed in all places, except(?) Pine Street in Thorold. Freight trains with diesel engines on the streets only from 1959 to the closing in about 2005. 
 St. Catharines was the center of the Niagara St. Catharines Toronto Railway. 
 Waterloo, Ontario:
 Caroline Street (from Erb Street West to Allen Street West, (CP Rail) tracks removed in 1994. Later reinstalled for ION light rail, in service again as of 2019)(the lightrail follows a different route) The former railway is now a trail - path. (To the south)

Croatia 
 Rijeka, freight trains (and occasional passenger trains) run from western to eastern cargo terminal of Port of Rijeka through the city centre.

Czechia 
Touristic (steam) trains run on the Highway, with police escorts.

Germany 
For tramways the legal separation of a street running trackbed and an exclusive trackbed in urban traffic is given in § 16 BOStrab tramway regulations. Germany has some street-running railways:

A freight branch of the Main-Neckar Railway features some street running sections in Darmstadt. The line is no longer in regular use, but a short dual gauge section (Kirschen Allee)(Evonik) was until 2015  connected to the metre gauge Darmstadt tram network allowed old trams to be loaded onto mainline vehicles for export.

Hong Kong

The MTR Light Rail running in and between the new towns of Tuen Mun, Yuen Long and Tin Shui Wai has many sections of on-street running, although the majority of the system runs on its own tracks alongside major roads or elevated viaducts, e.g., at the junctions near Tuen Mun Town Centre.

The KCR British Section had two street running stretches: a spur line to Whampoa Dockyard through , another across  and Canton Road to the Kowloon Godowns.

Japan 
 The Keihan Keishin and Ishiyama-Sakamoto lines have street running sections.

Laos 
 The rail link across the Thai–Lao Friendship Bridge over the Mekong River between Thailand and Laos is shared-use, although road traffic stops while trains cross the bridge.

New Zealand 

 Kawakawa : The Bay of Islands Vintage Railway, part of the former Opua Branch of the New Zealand Railways, runs down the middle of the state highway in the centre of Kawakawa.
 Hindon : The Taieri Gorge Railway, part of the former Otago Central Railway runs down the middle of a one lane road bridge in Hindon. These tourist passenger trains have the right of way, with only signs warning motorists of trains.

Switzerland 

Swiss law does not distinguish between trams and railways, making the distinction between street running by trams and that by railways legally indistinct.

 Zürich :  grain trains make up to 4 journeys a day between Bahnhof Hardbrücke and the Swissmill Tower on Sihlquai, following a  route along Zahnradstrasse, Hardstrasse and Zöllystrasse, including a tram crossing. The driver controls traffic lights manually.

United Kingdom 

Street running railways have been much rarer in the United Kingdom than elsewhere. This is due to 19th-century laws requiring railways to be enclosed by fences, which had the consequence that railways could not be built along existing roads and had to use their own rights of way. In cases where street running was unavoidable, the roads were often legally treated as level crossings with trains and road vehicles not permitted to use them at the same time. Some examples are:

 Weymouth: The most notable street running track was the Weymouth Harbour Tramway (despite the name, it was never used for trams and was a heavy-rail route); however this ended service to regular traffic since 1987, and to all traffic since 1999, with track removal starting in 2020.
 Porthmadog: The Porthmadog cross town link links the narrow-gauge Welsh Highland and Ffestiniog railways and includes 50 metres of street running over the Britannia Bridge in Porthmadog. The section that runs along a street is closed to road traffic by alternating red stop lights, as if it were an extended level crossing.
 Trafford Park: A freight-only street-running railway network was through Trafford Park; only one section alongside Barton Dock Road has seen use in recent years. This branch is abandoned and partially removed.
 Preston: The heritage Ribble Steam Railway runs across a swing bridge at the entrance to Preston Marina. The bridge is used by both road and rail traffic, but closed by barriers to road traffic when a train is crossing.

United States

Alabama
 Gadsden 
 Locust Street, between N1 Street and N6 Street.

Alaska
 Anton Anderson Memorial Tunnel. A one-lane tunnel that must be shared by cars and trains.
 Skagway: Unofficial government allows railroad tracks up Broadway. They were removed in 1947.

Arizona
 Phoenix
 11th. Ave.

California
 Oakland 
 Embarcadero West, between Martin Luther King Jr. Way and Webster Street; the only double street running track in the USA; the only Amtrak street running trackage in the USA; freight trains also run here; third track is no longer in use.

Colorado
 Fort Collins
 Mason Street. This railway opened in 1877, but 100 years later the city wanted the line around the city. It almost worked. But the train now has a free lane in the street.

Florida 
 Clearwater
 N East Ave.
 Tampa
 E Polk street.

Georgia
 Augusta
 6th Street.
 Columbus
 9th Street.

Illinois
 Rockford
 Madison Street.

Indiana
 Bedford
 J-street, between 14th and 18th street - Removed in 2022.
 Michigan City
 10th Street and 11th Street - This rail line is being moved as of February 27, 2022. The stretch of track running down 11th. Street will be doubled and the grade-separated.

 New Albany: 
 E 15th street - After about 10 years, this route will be used again in 2022.

Iowa
 Dubuque
 Salina street.

Kentucky
 La Grange
 Main Street - CSX mainline

Louisiana
 Gretna
 4th. Street.

Massachusetts
 Boston
 Union Freight Railroad, running along Atlantic Avenue (demolished after 1970)
 Holyoke
 Holyoke and Westfield Railroad, branch running along Water Street in use, other lines demolished or separated.

Michigan
 Alpena
 N 10th. Street.

Minnesota 
 International Falls
 Fort Frances–International Falls International Bridge, connecting to Fort Frances, Ontario Canada. There is no connection to the Canadian rail network through this bridge. No more trains to cross the bridge since the paper mill closed in 2014. The municipality is still hoping to be taken over by another company.
 Shakopee
2nd Avenue East and West, Union Pacific Railroad main line of the Mankato Subdivision still in use, former Chicago and Northwestern Railway (Omaha Road)
 Camp Ripley
The Camp Ripley Bridge , the Minnesota State Highway 115 bridge over the Mississippi River.

Missouri
 Saint Louis 
 Dorcas street. Brewery-trains. Until 2011 the brewery has an own railroad, the Manufacturers Railway; once they served several streets in the area. Now only the Dorcas Street trackage is in use. Track in S 2nd. Street to Rutger Street is partly still present but out of service. In S 2nd. Street, more than 10 tracks come/came out onto the street, at Barton Street.

New Jersey
 Garfield
 Monroe Street. Abandoned in 2020.

New York
 Utica
 Schuyler Street.

North Carolina
 Fayetteville
 Hillsborough Street.

Ohio
 Marietta
 Harmar street.

Oregon
 Salem
 Front Street NE.

Pennsylvania 
 Uniontown
 Beeson Blvd from West Penn St. to Library Pl. - Southwest Pennsylvania Railroad, trackage abandoned 2016)
 West Brownsville
 Main Street.

Tennesee
 Paris
 N Fentress St.-S Caldwell-McNeil St.

Texas
 San Antonio
 N Comal St. - San Antonio and Aransas Pass Railway, then SP, then UP. Removed and bypassed in 2005.
 Jones Ave. and Emma Koehler - Texas Transportation Company, electric trolley freight railway, most tracks removed 2002.

Virginia
 Richmond
 On a street without a name under the Triple Railroad Bridge Crossing.

Washington
 Renton
 Houser Way S.

West Virginia
 Saint Marys
 2nd. Street.

See also
 Green track
 Level crossing
 List of road-rail bridges
 List of road-rail tunnels
 Reserved track, where vehicles have a separate right of way (typically used in a tram transport context)
 Tram

Notes 
 (note c = error 404)

References

External links